Ban Mai Chaiyaphot is a district (amphoe) of Buriram province, northeastern Thailand.

History
The minor district (king amphoe) Ban Mai Chaiyaphot was created on 1 April 1992 by splitting off five tambons from Phutthaisong district. On 11 October 1997 it was upgraded to a full district.

Motto
The Ban Mai Chaiyaphot District's motto is "Ku Suan Taeng and Ku Reu See so elegant, beautiful silk, rocket festival."

Geography
Neighboring districts are (from the east clockwise) Phutthaisong of Buriram Province, Mueang Yang and Prathai of Nakhon Ratchasima province, and Nong Song Hong of Khon Kaen province.

Administration
The district is divided into five sub-districts (tambons), which are further subdivided into 55 villages (mubans). Ban Mai Chaiyaphot is a township (thesaban tambon) which covers parts of tambon Nong Waeng. There are also five tambon administrative organizations (TAO).

References

External links
amphoe.com

Ban Mai Chaiyaphot